The Fort of Greta (also referred to as the Castelo da Greta, Forte da Guia or Forte da Nossa Senhora da Guia da Horta, respectively: Castle of Greta, Fort of Greta or Fort of Our Lady of the Guide) is a medieval fortification, whose remnants are located on the cinder cone of Monte da Guia, along the southern coast of the civil parish of Angústias, in Horta, island of Faial, in the Portuguese Azores.

History 
Its construction was initiated in 1666, to complement the coastal defenses of the city of Horta, which at the time, was always under the threat of marauding pirates and privateers, as well as British, French and Spanish forces. It worked in conjunction with a similar fortification in the area of Areia Larga, on the island of Pico across the channel from Faial.

In the 20th century, with the opening of a roadway on Monte da Guia, parts of the fortification were demolished, in order to allow accessibility to the hermitage and communications equipment on its peak. The remains of the fort are actually in ruins: all but the original wall stone remains. In the 1950s, within the walls of the redoubt, the Portuguese government constructed a pair of elevated platforms in order to install maritime radar lookouts. The two-stage platforms occupy the interior courtyard of the redoubt.

The space was integrated into the Protected Landscape of Monte da Guia ( under regional decree 1/80/A, on 31 January 1980. It is classified as a property of public interest under the regional legislation on patrimony and culture, 13/84/A (31 March 1984) and under paragraph 4, of article 58, of the Regional Decree 29/2004/A (24 August 1984).

Architecture

Erected on the eastern flank of the Monte da Guia, in a dominant position over the Bay of Horta, and integrated into the medieval defensive system against pirates in the channel. It was built from masonry stone and volcanic rock: its most obvious extent is visible in the dozen canon battlements that face the island of Pico.

The design follows the irregular polygon-design of most forts, although many of the structures have been subsumed by erosion, debris and re-purposing by successive administrations. Much of the defensive plan has been superseded by early 20th century constructs, such as the double-platform radar observation towers and small buildings used to shelter military officers.

References
Notes

Sources
 
 
 
 
 
 
 

Greta
Buildings and structures in Horta, Azores